Nikolai Vladimirovich Skoblin (9 June 1892 – 1938?) was a general in the White Russian army, a senior operative in the émigré expatriate Russian All-Military Union (ROVS) and a recruited Soviet spy, who acted as an intermediary between the NKVD and the Gestapo in the Tukhachevsky affair and was instrumental in the abduction of the ROVS chairman Gen Yevgeny Miller in Paris in 1937. He was married to the Russian singer Nadezhda Plevitskaya. A number of important details about his cooperation with the USSR′s intelligence agencies as well as exact circumstances of his death have remained controversial and contested.

Early life and Russian Civil War
Skoblin was a cavalry officer in Lavr Kornilov′s Division of the White Russian Army during the Russian Civil War, 1918–1920.

It is believed that he met his wife, Nadezhda Plevitskaya, during the war. Plevitskaya was a committed Bolshevik considered to be a great beauty, who had been traveling the front singing and entertaining Red Army troops.

On 26 March 1920, aged 26, as the commander of the Kornilov Division within the Russian Army (under the command of Gen Pyotr Wrangel) he became Major General. After Wrangel's army defeat in November 1920, he evacuated to the Gallipoli, later moved to Bulgaria.

In exile

When in Bulgaria, in 1923, he was relieved of the position of commander of the Kornilov regiment (formed in the Gallipoli on the basis of the Kornilov Division's evacuees). Skoblin and his wife moved to Paris, where in 1929 he was reinstated as commander of Kornilov regiment by Gen Alexander Kutepov, chairman of the Russian All-Military Union (ROVS).

Nikolai Skoblin and his wife were recruited to the OGPU by his former regimental comrade in Paris in September 1930 and received code name Farmer. Skoblin was meanwhile gaining importance in the ROVS′ ranks and in 1935 he headed up the ROVS′ counter-intelligence branch, the Inner Line.

Nikolai Skoblin played a key role in the joint operation by Germany and NKVD against Soviet Marshal Mikhail Tukhachevsky, who, along with other senior Red Army commanders, was tried and executed on orders from Joseph Stalin in 1937. Skoblin contacted Reinhard Heydrich who manufactured documents about Tukhachevsky being a German spy, which were transferred to the Soviet top leadership by Skoblin. This story was originally uncovered by Soviet intelligence defector Walter Krivitsky in his 1939 book In Stalin's Secret Service; Walter Schellenberg in his memoirs published in 1956 wrote about Germany's intentional denunciation of Tukhachevsky, with Edvard Beneš being used a channel of this disinformation passed to Stalin.

On 22 September 1937, Skoblin, operating under the direction of deputy chief of Soviet foreign intelligence Sergey Spigelglas, lured the ROVS chairman Yevgeny Miller into an NKVD safe apartment for a meeting with two supposedly German officers. In reality, they were Soviet intelligence officers, Shpigelglas and NKVD Paris rezident Kislov. Miller was drugged and smuggled aboard a Soviet ship in Le Havre to Moscow, where he was tortured and finally executed on 11 May 1939. (Copies of letters written by Miller, while he was imprisoned in Moscow, are in the Dmitri Volkogonov papers at the Library of Congress.)

However, the NKVD's plan to have Skoblin promoted to presidency of the ROVS was thwarted, as Miller had been suspicious about Skoblin and the meeting, therefore he left behind a note with details of the meeting to be opened if he failed to return.

Death
There is no reliable information about the circumstances Skoblin's death.

According to Pavel Sudoplatov, Skoblin, aided by Soviet intelligence officer Leiba Feldbin (Orlov), escaped to Spain and died in Republican-held Barcelona during a bombing raid.

Plevitskaya was put on trial and convicted by the French authorities as an accomplice to the kidnapping and presumed murder of Miller. She died in French prison in 1940.

In the media
Skoblin's and Plevitskaya's story was fictionalized by Vladimir Nabokov, who had known Plevitskaya in Berlin, in his first English language story, "The Assistant Producer", in January 1943. It was also the basis of the French movie Triple Agent (2004) directed by Éric Rohmer. The Miller abduction and Skoblin's relationship with Max Eitingon was the subject of a rancorous squabble between Stephen Schwartz and Theodore Draper in the pages of the New York Review of Books in April 1988.

In addition, the kidnapping of General Miller is also fictionalized in Nikita Mikhalkov's award-winning film Burnt by the Sun. In the film the character known as "Mitya" (Oleg Menshikov) is a former White Army officer turned NKVD agent. Posing as a pianist in Paris, Mitya is described as having delivered eight White Generals to the NKVD. All are described as having been kidnapped, returned to Moscow and shot without trial. One of the generals is given the name "Weiner."

Notes and citations

References

Books
 
Victor Alexandrov, The Tukhachevsky Affair, Prentice-Hall, 1963. ASIN B0006D5JSY
John Costello and Oleg Tsarev, Deadly Illusions, Crown, 1993 
Wilhelm Hoettl, The Secret Front, Frederick A. Praeger, 1954 ASIN B0007EFR8Y ; Enigma Books (September 1, 2003) 
Igor Lukes, Czechoslovakia Between Stalin and Hitler, Oxford University Press, 1996 
Walter Krivitsky, In Stalin's Secret Service, Enigma Books, 2000 
Alexander Orlov, The March of Time, St. Ermins Press, 2004. 
Walter Schellenberg, The Labyrinth, Harper and Bros, 1956.
Pavel Sudoplatov, Special Tasks, Little, Brown and Company, 1994. 
Ally Hauptmann-Gurski, La Plevitskaya, Author's Publication, 2011 edition  (2006  out of print)

External links
НИКОЛАЙ СКОБЛИН (1893–1937) // 100 великих разведчиков by Igor Damaskin.
 

1892 births
1938 deaths
Russian generals
Russian people of World War I
White movement generals
Russian All-Military Union members
Soviet spies
NKVD officers
People killed in the Spanish Civil War
Deaths by airstrike